Northern California is a geographic and cultural region that generally comprises the northern portion of the U.S. state of California. Spanning the state's northernmost 48 counties, its main population centers include the San Francisco Bay Area (anchored by the cities of San Jose, San Francisco, and Oakland), the Greater Sacramento area (anchored by the state capital Sacramento), the Redding, California, area south of the Cascade Range, and the Metropolitan Fresno area (anchored by the city of Fresno). Northern California also contains redwood forests, along with most of the Sierra Nevada, including Yosemite Valley and part of Lake Tahoe, Mount Shasta (the second-highest peak in the Cascade Range after Mount Rainier in Washington), and most of the Central Valley, one of the world's most productive agricultural regions.

The 48-county definition is not used for the Northern California Megaregion, one of the 11 megaregions of the United States. The megaregion's area is instead defined from Metropolitan Fresno north to Greater Sacramento, and from the Bay Area east across Nevada state line to encompass the entire Lake Tahoe-Reno area.

Evidence of Native American habitation in the area dates from at least 19,000 years ago and successive waves of arrivals led to one of the most densely populated areas of pre-Columbian North America. The arrival of European explorers from the early 16th to the mid-18th centuries did not establish European settlements in northern California. In 1770, the Spanish mission at Monterey was the first European settlement in the area, followed by other missions along the coast—eventually extending as far north as Sonoma County.

Description 

Northern California is not a formal geographic designation. California's north–south midway division is around 37°N, which is near the level of San Francisco. Popularly, though, "Northern California" usually refers to the state's northernmost 48 counties. Because of California's large size and diverse geography, the state can be subdivided in other ways as well. For example, the Central Valley is a region that is distinct both culturally and topographically from coastal California, though in northern versus southern California divisions, the Sacramento Valley and most of the San Joaquin Valley are usually placed in northern California. Some observers describe three partitions of California, with north and south sections separated by Central California.

The state is often considered as having an additional division north of the urban areas of the San Francisco Bay Area and Sacramento metropolitan areas. Extreme northern residents have felt under-represented in state government and, in 1941, attempted to form a new state with southwestern Oregon to be called Jefferson, or more recently to introduce legislation to split California into two or three states. The coastal area north of the Bay Area is referred to as the North Coast, including the "Lost Coast" in the vicinity of Mendocino County, while the interior region north of Sacramento is referred to by locals as the Northstate.

Northern California was used for the name of a proposed new state on the 2018 California ballot created by splitting the existing state into three parts.

Significance 
Since the events of the California Gold Rush, Northern California has been a leader on the world's economic, scientific, and cultural stages. From the development of gold mining techniques and logging practices in the 19th century that were later adopted around the world, to the development of world-famous and online business models (such as Apple, Hewlett-Packard, Google, Yahoo!, and eBay), northern California has been at the forefront of new ways of doing business. In science, advances range from being the first to isolate and name fourteen transuranic chemical elements, to breakthroughs in microchip technology. Cultural contributions include the works of Ansel Adams, George Lucas, and Clint Eastwood, as well as beatniks, the Summer of Love, winemaking, the cradle of the international environmental movement, and the open, casual workplace first popularized in the Silicon Valley dot-com boom and now widely in use around the world. Other examples of innovation across diverse fields range from Genentech (development and commercialization of genetic engineering) to CrossFit as a pioneer in extreme human fitness and training.
It is also home to one of the largest Air Force Bases on the West Coast, and the largest in California, Travis Air Force Base.

Cities 
Northern California's largest metropolitan area is the San Francisco Bay Area which consists of 9 counties: Alameda, Contra Costa, Marin, Napa, San Francisco, San Mateo, Santa Clara, Solano, and Sonoma counties. The Bay Area consists of the major cities of San Jose, San Francisco, Oakland, and their many suburbs. Although not a part of the Bay Area, in recent years the Bay Area has drawn more commuters from as far as Central Valley cities such as Sacramento, Stockton, Fresno, Turlock and Modesto. These cities in the central part of the Central Valley and Sierra Nevada foothills may be viewed as part of a single megalopolis. The 2010 U.S. Census showed that the Bay Area grew at a faster rate than the Greater Los Angeles Area while Greater Sacramento had the largest growth rate of any metropolitan area in California.

The state's larger inland cities are considered part of Northern California in cases when the state is divided into two parts. Key cities in the region which are not in major metropolitan areas include Eureka on the far North Coast, Redding, at the northern end of the Central Valley, Chico, and Yuba City in the mid-north of the Central Valley, as well as Fresno and Visalia on the southern end. Though smaller in each case, with the notable exception of Fresno, than the larger cities of the general region, these smaller regional centers are often of historical and economic importance for their respective size, due to their locations, which are primarily rural or otherwise isolated.

History

Prehistory to 1847 
Inhabited for millennia by Native Americans, from the Shasta tribe in the north, to the Miwoks in the central coast and Sierra Nevada, to the Yokuts of the southern Central Valley, northern California was among the most densely populated areas of pre-Columbian North America.

European explorers 
The first European to explore the coast was Juan Rodríguez Cabrillo, sailing for the Spanish Crown; in 1542, Cabrillo's expedition sailed perhaps as far north as the Rogue River in today's Oregon. Beginning in 1565, the Spanish Manila galleons crossed the Pacific Ocean from Mexico to the Spanish Philippines, with silver and gemstones from Mexico. The Manila galleons returned across the northern Pacific, and reached North America usually off the coast of northern California, and then continued south with their Asian trade goods to Mexico.

In 1579, northern California was visited by the English explorer Sir Francis Drake who landed north of today's San Francisco and claimed the area for England. In 1602, the Spaniard Sebastián Vizcaíno explored California's coast as far north as Monterey Bay, where he went ashore. Other Spanish explorers sailed along the coast of northern California for the next 150 years, but no settlements were established.

Spanish era 
The first European inhabitants were Spanish missionaries, who built missions along the California coast. The mission at Monterey was first established in 1770, and at San Francisco in 1776. In all, ten missions stretched along the coast from Sonoma to Monterey (and still more missions to the southern tip of Baja California). In 1786, the French signaled their interest in the northern California area by sending a voyage of exploration to Monterey.

The first twenty years of the 19th century continued the colonization of the northern California coast by Spain. Outside of this zone, perhaps 200,000 to 250,000 Native Americans continued to lead traditional lives. The Adams-Onís Treaty, signed in 1819 between Spain and the young United States, set the northern boundary of the Spanish claims at the 42nd parallel, effectively creating today's northern boundary of northern California.

Russian presence 
In 1812, the Russian state-sponsored Russian-American Company established Fort Ross, a fur trading outpost on the coast of today's Sonoma County. In 1839, the settlement was abandoned due to its inability to meet resource demands, and the increasing Mexican and American presence in the region.

Mexican era 
After Mexico gained independence from Spain in 1821, Mexico continued Spain's missions and settlements in northern California as well as Spain's territorial claims. The Mexican Californios (Spanish-speaking Californians) in these settlements primarily traded cattle hides and tallow with American and European merchant vessels.

In 1825, the Hudson's Bay Company established a major trading post just north of today's Portland, Oregon. British fur trappers and hunters then used the Siskiyou Trail to travel throughout northern California. The leader of a further French scientific expedition to northern California, Eugene Duflot de Mofras, wrote in 1840 "...it is evident that California will belong to whatever nation chooses to send there a man-of-war and two hundred men." By the 1830s, a significant number of non-Californios had immigrated to northern California. Chief among these was John Sutter, a European immigrant from Switzerland, who was granted  centered on the area of today's Sacramento.

American interest 
American trappers began entering northern California in the 1830s. In 1834, American visionary Ewing Young led a herd of horses and mules over the Siskiyou Trail from missions in northern California to British and American settlements in Oregon. Although a small number of American traders and trappers had lived in northern California since the early 1830s, the first organized overland party of American immigrants to arrive in northern California was the Bartleson-Bidwell Party of 1841 via the new California Trail. Also in 1841, an overland exploratory party of the United States Exploring Expedition came down the Siskiyou Trail from the Pacific Northwest. In 1846, the Donner Party earned notoriety as they struggled to enter northern California.

Californian independence and beginning of the United States era 
When the Mexican–American War was declared on May 13, 1846, it took almost two months (mid-July 1846) for word to get to California. On June 14, 1846, some 30 non-Mexican settlers, mostly Americans, staged a revolt and seized the small Mexican garrison in Sonoma. They raised the "Bear Flag" of the California Republic over Sonoma. The "Bear Flag Republic" lasted only 26 days, until the U.S. Army, led by John Frémont, took over on July 9. The California state flag today is based on this original Bear Flag, and continues to contain the words "California Republic."

Commodore John Drake Sloat ordered his naval forces to occupy Yerba Buena (present San Francisco) on July 7 and within days American forces controlled San Francisco, Sonoma, and Sutter's Fort in Sacramento. The treaty ending the Mexican–American War was signed on February 2, 1848, and Mexico formally ceded Alta California (including all of present-day northern California) to the United States.

Gold Rush and California statehood 
The California Gold Rush took place almost exclusively in northern California from 1848 to 1855. It began on January 24, 1848, when gold was discovered at Sutter's Mill in Coloma. News of the discovery soon spread, resulting in some 300,000 people coming to California from the rest of the United States and abroad. San Francisco grew from a tiny hamlet, home to about 1,000 Californios into a boomtown of over 50,000 people in the 12 years between 1848 and 1860. New roads, churches, and schools were built, and new towns sprung up, aided in part by the development of new methods of transportation such as steamships which came into regular service and railroads which now connected the coasts. The Gold Rush also had negative effects: American colonists chose to use genocide as a tool to remove the Indigenous people so that they could look for gold on their land. Native oyster species saw their numbers plummet when American colonists began over-harvesting them, leading to a near-extinction of the oysters from the California coast on up into the Pacific Northwest, and gold mining caused environmental harm.

The Gold Rush also increased pressure to make California a U.S. state. Pro-slavery politicians initially attempted to permanently divide northern and southern California at 36 degrees, 30 minutes, the line of the Missouri Compromise. But instead, the passing of the Compromise of 1850 enabled California to be admitted to the Union as a free state.

Population and agricultural expansion (1855–1899) 

The decades following the Gold Rush brought dramatic expansion to northern California, both in population and economically – particularly in agriculture. The completion of the First transcontinental railroad in 1869, with its terminus in Sacramento (and then later, Oakland), meant that northern California's agricultural produce (and some manufactured goods) could now be shipped economically to the rest of the United States. In return, immigrants from the rest of the United States (and Europe) could comfortably come to northern California. A network of railroads spread throughout northern California, and in 1887, a rail link was completed to the Pacific Northwest. Almost all of these railways came under the control of the Southern Pacific Railroad, headquartered in San Francisco, and San Francisco continued as a financial and cultural center.

Substantial tensions during this era included nativist sentiments (primarily against Chinese immigrants), tensions between the increasing power of the Southern Pacific Railroad and small farmers, and the beginnings of the labor union movement.

Economy 

Northern California's economy is noted for being the de facto world leader in high-tech industry (software, semiconductor/micro-electronics, biotechnology and medical devices/instruments), as well as being known for clean power, biomedical, government, and finance. Other significant industries include tourism, shipping, manufacturing, and agriculture. Its economy is diverse, though more concentrated in high technology, and subject to the whims of venture capital than any other major regional economy in the nation especially within Silicon Valley, and less dependent on oil and residential housing than Southern California. It is home to the state capital, as well as several Western United States regional offices in San Francisco, such as the Federal Reserve and 9th Circuit Court.

Climate 

Northern California has a warm or mild to cold climate, in which the Sierra gets snow in the late fall through winter and occasionally into spring. Summers are mild along the coast and generally warm and dry, while winters are cool and usually wet. The high temperatures range from 50s to 30s in the winters while summers temperature range is 90s to 60s or 50s, with highs well into the 100s for the Sacramento region. Snow covers the mountains (generally above 3000 feet) in mid January through February. Fog occurs infrequently or occurs normally in the west and coast, especially in the summer, creating some of the coolest summer conditions in North America. Since the first decade of the 21st century, droughts and wildfires have increased in frequency as a consequence of climate change.

Population 

The population of the forty-eight counties of northern California has shown a steady increase over the years.

The largest percentage increase outside the Gold Rush era (52%) came during the 1940s, as the region was the destination of many post-War veterans and their families, attracted by the greatly expanding industrial base and (often) by their time stationed in northern California during World War II. The largest absolute increase occurred during the 1980s (over 2.1 million person increase), attracted by job opportunities in part by the expansion taking place in Silicon Valley and the Cold War era expansion of the defense industry. Since the 2000 U.S. Census, Northern California has grown at a faster rate than Southern California due to the strong economic performances of the Bay Area and Sacramento.

Parks and other protected areas

National Park System 

The U.S. National Park System controls a large and diverse group of parks in northern California. The best known is Yosemite National Park, which is displayed on the reverse side of the California state quarter. Other prominent parks are the Kings Canyon-Sequoia National Park complex, Redwood National Park, Pinnacles National Park, Lassen Volcanic National Park and the largest in the contiguous forty-eight states, Death Valley National Park.

National Monuments and other federally protected areas 

Other areas under federal protection include Muir Woods National Monument, Giant Sequoia National Monument, Devils Postpile National Monument, Lava Beds National Monument, Point Reyes National Seashore, the Monterey Bay National Marine Sanctuary, and the Cordell Bank and Gulf of the Farallones National Marine Sanctuaries (both off the coast of San Francisco). Included within the latter National Marine Sanctuary is the Farallon National Wildlife Refuge; this National Wildlife Refuge is one of approximately twenty-five such refuges in northern California. National forests occupy large sections of northern California, including the Shasta–Trinity, Klamath, Modoc, Lassen, Mendocino, Eldorado, Tahoe, and Sequoia national forests, among others. Included within (or adjacent to) national forests are federally protected wilderness areas, including the Trinity Alps, Castle Crags, Granite Chief, and Desolation wilderness areas.

In addition, the National Park Service administers protected areas on Alcatraz Island, the Golden Gate National Recreation Area, Whiskeytown–Shasta–Trinity National Recreation Area, and the Smith River National Recreation Area. The NPS also administers the Manzanar National Historic Site in Inyo County, the Rosie the Riveter World War II Home Front National Historical Park in Richmond, and the Tule Lake National Monument outside of Tulelake.

Other 

 Tilden Regional Park
 Alum Rock Park
 Angel Island
 Bidwell Park
 Big Basin Redwoods State Park
 Butano State Park
 Calaveras Big Trees State Park
 Castle Rock State Park
 Caswell Memorial State Park
 East Bay Regional Park District
 Farallon Islands
 Golden Gate Park
 Henry W. Coe State Park
 Humboldt Redwoods State Park
 Jedediah Smith Redwoods State Park
 Lake Tahoe Basin
 Marble Mountain Wilderness
 Mill Creek State Park
 Mount Tamalpais State Park
 Suisun Marsh
 Sacramento River
 Talowa Dunes State Park
 Turtle Bay Exploration Park
 McArthur–Burney Falls Memorial State Park
 Wilder Ranch State Park
 Sequoia National Park

Educational institutions 
Northern California hosts a number of world-renowned universities including Stanford University and University of California, Berkeley. Top-tier public graduate schools include Boalt Hall and Hastings law schools and UC San Francisco (a top-ranked medical school) and UC Davis School of Veterinary Medicine, the largest veterinary school in the United States.

Public 
 Six University of California campuses:

UC Berkeley
UC Davis
UC Hastings
UC Merced
UC San Francisco
UC Santa Cruz

 Eleven California State University campuses:

 California Maritime Academy
 Chico State
 CSU East Bay
 CSU Monterey Bay
 Fresno State
 Humboldt State
 Sacramento State
 San Francisco State
 San Jose State
 Sonoma State
 Stanislaus State

 A large number of local community colleges

Private 
(Partial list)
 Brandman University
 Dominican University
 Drexel University Sacramento
 Fresno Pacific University
 Holy Names University
 Mills College
 Northwestern Polytechnic University
 Pacific Union College
 Stanford University
 Santa Clara University
 St. Mary's College
 Simpson University
 Touro University California
 University of San Francisco
 University of the Pacific
 William Jessup University
 Academy of Art University
 Notre Dame de Namur University
 Samuel Merritt University

Research 

(Partial list)
 American Institute of Mathematics
 Bodega Marine Reserve
 Hopkins Marine Station
 Joint Genome Institute
 Lawrence Berkeley National Laboratory
 Lawrence Livermore National Laboratory
 Lick Observatory
 Long Marine Laboratory
 Mathematical Sciences Research Institute
 Monterey Bay Aquarium Research Institute
 NASA Ames Research Center
 Owens Valley Radio Observatory
 Pacific Institute
 Point Reyes Bird Observatory
 White Mountain Research Station

Counties 

 Alameda
 Alpine
 Amador
 Butte
 Calaveras
 Colusa
 Contra Costa
 Del Norte
 El Dorado
 Fresno
 Glenn
 Humboldt
 Inyo
 Kings
 Lake
 Lassen
 Madera
 Marin
 Mariposa
 Mendocino
 Merced
 Modoc
 Mono
 Monterey
 Napa
 Nevada
 Placer
 Plumas
 Sacramento
 San Benito
 San Francisco
 San Joaquin
 San Mateo
 Santa Clara
 Santa Cruz
 Shasta
 Sierra
 Siskiyou
 Solano
 Sonoma
 Stanislaus
 Sutter
 Tehama
 Trinity
 Tulare
 Tuolumne
 Yolo
 Yuba

Regions 
The following regions are entirely or partly within northern California:

 Big Sur
 Cascade Range
 Central California
 Central Coast
 Central Valley
 Coastal California
 East Bay (SF)
 Eastern California
 Emerald Triangle
 Gold Country
 Greater Sacramento
 Klamath Basin
 Lake Tahoe
 Lassen Peak
 Lost Coast
 Metropolitan Fresno
 Mount Shasta
 North Bay (SF)
 North Coast
 Russian River
 Sacramento Valley
 San Francisco Bay Area
 San Francisco Peninsula
 San Joaquin Valley
 Santa Clara Valley
 Shasta Cascade
 Sierra Nevada
 Silicon Valley
 South Bay (SF)
 Telecom Valley
 Tri-Valley
 Trinity Alps
 Wine Country
 Yosemite
 Yuba–Sutter area

Cities and towns with more than 50,000 inhabitants

Metropolitan areas 
Northern California is home to three of the state's four extended metropolitan areas, which are home to over three-fourths of the region's population as of the 2010 United States Census:

Major business districts 
The following are major central business districts:
 San Francisco Financial District
 Downtown Oakland
 Downtown Sacramento
 Downtown San Jose

Transportation 
See also articles:

 Transportation in the Sacramento metropolitan area
 Transportation in the San Francisco Bay Area

See also categories:

 Transportation in Alameda County
 Transportation in Alpine County
 Transportation in Amador County
 Transportation in Butte County
 Transportation in Calaveras County
 Transportation in Colusa County
 Transportation in Contra Costa County
 Transportation in Del Norte County
 Transportation in El Dorado County
 Transportation in Fresno County
 Transportation in Glenn County
 Transportation in Humboldt County
 Transportation in Inyo County
 Transportation in Kings County
 Transportation in Lake County
 Transportation in Lassen County
 Transportation in Madera County
 Transportation in Marin County
 Transportation in Mariposa County
 Transportation in Mendocino County
 Transportation in Merced County
 Transportation in Modoc County
 Transportation in Mono County
 Transportation in Monterey County
 Transportation in Napa County
 Transportation in Nevada County
 Transportation in Oakland
 Transportation in Placer County
 Transportation in Plumas County
 Transportation in Sacramento
 Transportation in Sacramento County
 Transportation in San Benito County
 Transportation in the San Francisco Bay Area
 Transportation in San Francisco
 Transportation in San Joaquin County
 Transportation in San Mateo County
 Transportation in Santa Clara County
 Transportation in Santa Cruz County
 Transportation in Shasta County
 Transportation in Sierra County
 Transportation in Siskiyou County
 Transportation in Solano County
 Transportation in Sonoma County
 Transportation in Stanislaus County
 Transportation in Sutter County
 Transportation in Tehama County
 Transportation in Trinity County
 Transportation in Tulare County
 Transportation in Tuolumne County
 Transportation in Yolo County
 Transportation in Yuba County

Airports 

There are 11 airports in Northern California categorized as Primary Service Commercial airports by the FAA:

Railroad 

 Bay Area Rapid Transit (BART) – commuter subway connecting most of the core Bay Area including San Francisco, Oakland, and San Jose
 Caltrain – commuter rail between San Francisco and Gilroy (south of San Jose)
 Muni Metro (San Francisco)
 VTA Light Rail (San Jose)
 Altamont Commuter Express (ACE) – commuter train connecting Stockton and the Central Valley with San Jose and the Bay Area
 Sacramento Regional Transit District light rail
 Amtrak:
 California Zephyr – connects Chicago to the Bay Area
 Capitol Corridor – San Jose to Auburn (eastern suburb of Sacramento)
 Coast Starlight – coastal train between Los Angeles and Seattle with northern California stops in San Jose, Oakland, and Sacramento
 San Joaquin – Central Valley train linking Bakersfield in the Central Valley to Sacramento and Oakland

Major transit organizations 
 AC Transit
 Arcata and Mad River Transit System
 County Connection
 El Dorado Transit
 Eureka Transit Service
 Fairfield and Suisun Transit
 Fresno Area Express
 Golden Gate Transit
 Lake Transit
 Mendocino Transit Authority
 Monterey-Salinas Transit
 Porterville City Operated Local Transit
 Redwood Transit System
 SamTrans
 San Benito Express
 SF MUNI
 San Joaquin Regional Transit District
 Santa Clara Valley Transportation Authority (VTA)
 Santa Cruz Metro
 Solano Express
 SolTrans
 Sonoma County Transit
 Tri Delta Transit
 Visalia Transit
 VINE (Napa County)

Major transit ferries 

 San Francisco Bay Ferry
 Golden Gate Ferry
 Blue & Gold Fleet
 Angel Island – Tiburon Ferry

Freeways

Interstate highways 
  Interstate 80 (Eastshore Freeway/Lincoln Highway)
  Interstate 280 (Southern Embarcadero Freeway/Southern Freeway/Junipero Serra Freeway/Sinclair Freeway)
  Interstate 380
  Interstate 580 (Eastshore Freeway/MacArthur Freeway/Brown Freeway)
  Interstate 680 (Joseph P. Sinclair Freeway/Donald D. Doyle Highway/Blue Star Memorial Highway/Luther E. Gibson Freeway)
  Interstate 780
  Interstate 880 (Nimitz Freeway)
  Interstate 980 (Grove-Shafter Freeway)
  Interstate 238
  Interstate 5 (Golden State Freeway/West Side Freeway)
  Interstate 205 (Robert T. Monagan Freeway)
  Interstate 505
  Interstate 80 Business (Capital City Freeway)

U.S. Routes 

  U.S. Route 6
  U.S. Route 50 (El Dorado Freeway)
  U.S. Route 101 (South Valley Freeway/Bayshore Freeway/James Lick Freeway/Central Freeway/Redwood Highway/Michael J. Burns Freeway/Redwood Highway)
  U.S. Route 395
  U.S. Route 97
  U.S. Route 199

Principal state highways 
  State Route 1 (Pacific Coast Highway/Cabrillo Highway)
  State Route 3
  State Route 4
  State Route 9
  State Route 12
  State Route 13 (Ashby Avenue/Tunnel Road/Warren Freeway)
  State Route 16
  State Route 17
  State Route 20
  State Route 24
  State Route 25
  State Route 26
  State Route 29
  State Route 32
  State Route 33
  State Route 35 (Skyline Boulevard)
  State Route 36
  State Route 37 (Sears Point Tollway)
  State Route 41 (E.G. Lewis Highway, Yosemite Freeway, Southern Yosemite Highway, Wawona Road)
  State Route 43
  State Route 44
  State Route 49 (Golden Chain Highway)
  State Route 59
 // State Route 61 (Webster Tube/Posey Tube/Doolittle Drive/Davis Street)
  State Route 63
  State Route 65
  State Route 68
  State Route 70
  State Route 82 (Monterey Highway/El Camino Real/Mission Street)
  State Route 84
  State Route 85 (Stevens Creek Freeway/West Valley Freeway/Norman Y. Mineta Highway/CHP Officer Scott M. Greenly Memorial Freeway)
  State Route 87 (Guadalupe Parkway)
  State Route 88
  State Route 89
  State Route 92 (J. Arthur Younger Freeway/Jackson Street)
  State Route 96
  State Route 99
  State Route 104
  State Route 108
  State Route 113
  State Route 116
  State Route 120
  State Route 121
  State Route 128
  State Route 130
  State Route 132
  State Route 137
  State Route 139
  State Route 140
  State Route 152
  State Route 156
  State Route 160 (North Sacramento Freeway/River Road)
  State Route 162
  State Route 165
  State Route 168
  State Route 174
  State Route 180
 / State Route 185 (International Boulevard/East 14th Street/Mission Boulevard)
  State Route 190
  State Route 193
  State Route 198
  State Route 201
  State Route 216
  State Route 219
  State Route 236
  State Route 237
  State Route 238 (Mission Boulevard, Foothill Boulevard)
  State Route 245
  State Route 254 (Avenue of the Giants)
  State Route 262 (Mission Boulevard)
  State Route 267
  State Route 269
  State Route 275 (Tower Bridge Gateway)
  State Route 299

Communication

Telephone area codes 
 209 — Northern San Joaquin Valley (Stockton, Modesto, and Merced).
 408/669 — Most of Santa Clara County (San Jose and Gilroy).
 415/628 — San Francisco, Daly City, and Marin County. One of the three original Area Codes in California.
 510/341 — Inner East Bay (Oakland, Berkeley, Richmond, and Fremont). Originally part of area code 415.
 530 — A large northeastern section of the region including Tehama County, Shasta County, Lassen County, Yuba County, Sutter County, Butte County, and Nevada County. Split from area code 916 in 1997–1998.
 559 — Southern San Joaquin Valley (Madera, Fresno, and Visalia).
 650 — San Francisco Peninsula (San Mateo, Redwood City, and Palo Alto). Originally part of area code 415.
 707 — The North Coast section of the region from Sonoma County to the Oregon border. Cities include Eureka, Ukiah, Santa Rosa, Napa, Vallejo and Fairfield.
 831 — Monterey, San Benito and Santa Cruz Counties. Originally part of area code 408.
 916/279 — Sacramento County and the Sacramento suburbs in western Placer and El Dorado Counties. One of the three original area codes in California, formerly covered all areas now within 530.
 925 — Outer East Bay (Concord, Pittsburg, Walnut Creek, San Ramon, Pleasanton and Livermore). Originally part of area codes 415 and 510.

Sports

Major league professional sports teams

College sports teams 
 California Golden Bears
 Cal Poly Humboldt Lumberjacks
 Stanford Cardinal
 Fresno State Bulldogs
 San Jose State Spartans
 Sacramento State Hornets
 UC Davis Aggies

Sports venues 
 Laguna Seca Raceway (motorsport)
 Sonoma Raceway (motorsport)
 Olympic Club (golf)
 Silverado Country Club (golf)
 TPC Harding Park (golf)
 TPC Stonebrae (golf)

Sporting events 
 Pac-12 Football Championship Game (college football)
 Emerald Bowl (college football)
 AT&T Pebble Beach Pro-Am (golf)
 Frys.com Open (golf)
 Swinging Skirts LPGA Classic (golf)
 Grand Prix of Sonoma (motorsport)
 Toyota/Save Mart 350 (motorsport)
 Monterey Sports Car Championships (motorsport)
 Superbike World Championship (motorsport)

See also 

 Northern California Megaregion
 California megapolitan areas
 Central California
 History of California through 1899
 History of the west coast of North America
 Jefferson (proposed Pacific state)
 Megaregions of the United States
 Southern California

References

External links 

 
Real Estate Engineering and Architect Service in California. 

 
Megapolitan areas of California
Regions of California